Camilla Løw (born 1976) is a contemporary Norwegian artist. She graduated from Asker Kunstskole in Norway in 1998. After this, she left for Glasgow, where she graduated from the Glasgow School of Art in 2001 with a BA in Fine Art.

Exhibitions
 2008 Straight Letters, Pier Arts Centre, Orkney
 2008 Straight Letters, Dundee Contemporary Arts, Dundee
 2008 Embraced Open Reassembled, Sutton Lane, London
 2008 New Ruins, Bergen Kunsthall No.5
 2010 Culture & Leisure, New Art Centre, Roche Court, Salisbury
 2012 The Space of Shape-Time, The National Museum of Art, Architecture and Design, Oslo
 2013 Camilla Løw:One Night Only, UKS, Oslo
 2016 Eye in the Sky, Kunstnerforbundet, Oslo

Residencies
2010 Colab Art & Architecture, Bangalore - Office for Contemporary Art, Oslo.
2002 Sirius Art Centre, Cobh, Cork,

Collections
The National Museum of Art, Architecture and Design, Norway,
The British Arts Council Collection, UK
The Government Art Collection, UK
The Piers Art Collection, Orkney
Region Skåne, Sweden
The Ruppert Collection of post-1945 Concrete Art Museum in Kultuspeicher, Wurzberg, Germany
The Statoil Art Collection, Norway
The Storebrand Art Collection, Norway
Broken Thrones funded by Skulpturstopp.

References

Further reading 

 2003 Norwich School of Art and Design: "East International". Tramway, Glasgow: "The Echo Show". NIFCA: "Greyscale/CMYK ".
 2005 "Contemporary Nordic Sculpture 1980 – 2005", Wanås Foundation. Artforum, April 2005: Michael Archer: "Camilla Løw: Sutton Lane". MAP, issue 1: Diana Baldon: "Camilla Løw" The Wallpaper, Januar/Februar, s.44-49 Morgenbladet, Tommy Olsson "Blankness is not a void", Standard (Oslo) 2004 O2, n.32: Vincent Honore, "Future of Ecstasy". The British Council, Athen, "Britannia Works".
 2006 "How to Improve the World – British Art 1946-2006", Hayward Gallery. Momentum, Moss: "Try again. Fail again. Fail better". Paris-art.com, July: Nicolas Bauche: "Henriette Grahnert et Camilla Løw".
 2007 "Language of Vision”, Middlesbrough Institute of Modern Art, Middlesbrough. StatoilHydro – Art Grant, Kunstnerforbundet, Oslo. "DUMP: Postmodern Sculpture in the Dissolved Field", The National Museum of Art, Architecture and Design, Oslo.
 2008 Art Review December 2008: Martin Coomer: Camilla Løw "Embraced Open Reassembled" Sutton Lane (London) Bergens Tidende 2/12/2008: "New Ruins", Bergen Kunsthall. Klassekampen 19/11 2008: "New Ruins", Bergen Kunsthall. "Straight Letters", Dundee Contemporary Arts, Dundee, Scotland. The Herald, 9/02/08; The Scotsman 10/02/08: "Highs of Low". The Scotsman 13/02/08: "Finding the beauty in simplicity". The List 14/02: "Camilla Løw, Straight Letters" The Herald 29/02: "An encoded vision of a sinister age".* 2009 "Grey Cells. Camilla Løw and Order", Dieter Roelstraete, Mousse Magazine. Vitamin 3-D, New Perspectives in Sculpture and Installation, Phaidon. Carnegie Art Award 2010 Aftenposten 2/3 2009: Lotte Sandberg: "Streker i rommet", Camilla Løw. "All That is Solid Melts Into Air", MuHKA, Antwerp.
 2012 Henie Onstad Art Centre "The Space of Shape-Time", The National Museum of Art, Architecture and Design. Aftenposten, Kjetil Røed (4.8) Klassekampen, Mona Gjessing (20.06) D2, Kåre Bulie (08.06)
 2013 Camilla Løw's "Spring Rain", Matthew Rana, Art Agenda (22.2) Matematik med Fysik, Thomas Millroth, Sydsvenskan (15.2)

1976 births
Living people
21st-century Norwegian artists
21st-century Norwegian women artists
Alumni of the Glasgow School of Art
Artists from Oslo